In aviation terminology, a rejected takeoff (RTO) or aborted takeoff is the situation in which it is decided to abort the takeoff of an airplane.

There can be many reasons for deciding to perform a rejected takeoff, but they are usually due to a suspected or actual problem with the aircraft, such as an engine failure; fire; incorrect configuration; aircraft controllability; environmental conditions such as predictive windshear; or an instruction from Air Traffic Control.

There are three phases of a takeoff. In the low-speed regime, usually below 80 kts or so, the takeoff will be rejected even for minor failures. In the high-speed regime, above usually 80 kts but below V1, minor problems are ignored, but the takeoff will still be rejected for serious problems, in particular for engine failures. The takeoff decision speed, known as V1, is calculated before each flight for larger multi-engine airplanes. Below the decision speed, the airplane should be able to stop safely before the end of the runway. Above the decision speed, the airplane may overshoot the runway if the takeoff is aborted, and, therefore, a rejected takeoff is normally not performed above this speed, unless there is reason to doubt the airplane's ability to fly. If a serious failure occurs or is suspected above V1, but the airplane's ability to fly is not in doubt, the takeoff is continued despite the (suspected) failure, and the airplane will attempt to land again as soon as possible.  If the airplane's ability to fly is in doubt (for instance, in the event of a major flight-control failure which leaves the airplane unable to rotate for liftoff), the best option may well be to reject the takeoff even if after V1, accepting the likelihood of a runway overrun.

Single-engine aircraft will reject any takeoff after an engine failure, regardless of speed, as there is no power available to continue the takeoff. Even if the airplane is already airborne, if sufficient runway remains, an attempt to land straight ahead on the runway may be made. This may also apply to some light twin-engine airplanes. 

Before the takeoff roll is started, the autobrake system of the aircraft, if available, is armed. The autobrake system will automatically apply maximum brakes if throttle is reduced to idle or reverse thrust during the takeoff roll once a preset speed has been reached.

RTO testing 
An RTO is usually seen as one of the most challenging tests an airplane has to undergo for its certification trials. The RTO test is performed under the worst possible conditions; i.e. with fully worn out brakes, the plane loaded to maximum takeoff weight and no use of thrust reversers. During an RTO test most of the kinetic energy of the airplane is converted to heat by the brakes, which may cause the fusible plugs of the tires to melt, causing them to deflate. Small brake fires are acceptable, providing that in the first five minutes, they do not prejudice the safe and complete evacuation of the aircraft.

Accidents involving rejected take-offs
 2008 South Carolina Learjet 60 crash – an RTO above V1, four fatalities
 Air France Flight 007 – RTO above V1 after flight-control failure, 130 fatalities
 1990 Wayne County Airport runway collision – RTO after collision following runway incursion; aircraft struck destroyed with eight fatalities, aircraft that performed RTO damaged with no fatalities, later repaired
 Ameristar Charters Flight 9363 – RTO above V1 after flight-control failure, aircraft written off but no fatalities
 British Airtours Flight 28M – uncontained engine failure that damaged a fuel tank, resulting in a major fire and 55 fatalities
 Garuda Indonesia Flight 865 – RTO after engine failure, three fatalities
 Spantax Flight 995 – an RTO above V1, 50 fatalities
 TWA Flight 843 – RTO after engine failure
 British Airways Flight 2276 – uncontained engine failure
 Korean Air Flight 2708 – uncontained engine failure
 American Airlines Flight 383 – uncontained engine failure and fire

See also
Balanced field takeoff

References

External links
Airliners.net – Photos detailing a RTO performed by a Lockheed Tristar at Amsterdam Schiphol Airport 
History of RTO Operations at Evergreen with good explanatory notes
 
 Boeing 747-8 rejected take-off test, 2011

Emergency aircraft operations
Types of take-off and landing